The United States national netball team represents the United States in international netball competition at the quadrennial World Netball Championships for the INF Netball World Cup. The US national team comprises mostly expatriate players from Commonwealth countries where netball is popular, including Jamaica. The team competed at the 2003 World Netball Championships in Jamaica, finishing 9th. Prior to 2008, the final placings of the World Netball Championships were used to determine INF World Rankings, and from 2003–07 United States was ranked 9th. It did not compete at the 2007 World Netball Championships in New Zealand. As of December 2, 2019, United States is ranked in the world at 37th.

Roster
A 15-player squad was selected to compete at the AFNA World Championships qualifiers, held from July 22–28, 2010 in Saint Lucia. The United States did not advance from the qualifiers, narrowly missing out on goal average having the same number of points as Barbados, with Trinidad and Tobago and Barbados joining Jamaica in representing the Americas at the 2011 World Netball Championships in Singapore.

Competitive record

References

External links
 USANA website

National netball teams of the Americas
Netball in the United States
Netball